John William Southern (born 2 September 1952) is a former English first-class cricketer. He was a right-handed batsman and a slow left-arm orthodox who played county cricket for Hampshire County Cricket Club.

Southern, who was born in Kings Cross, London, made his Hampshire debut in 1975 and went on to play for the club for 8 seasons until 1983. Southern played 164 first-class and 25 one-day matches for the club.

External links 
 

1952 births
English cricketers
Hampshire cricketers
Living people
People from Kings Cross, London